St John Fisher Catholic High School, formerly known as St. John Fisher RC Comprehensive School, is situated in the city of Peterborough, England, and is the only Catholic school in Cambridgeshire.  The school moved back onto the Park Lane site and was reopened on 25 February 2009.

Sixth form 
The school has a strong sixth form with approximately half of Year 11 staying on each year to complete A level courses.  Students are required to have obtained at least five GCSE grades from A* to C in order to take up any A level course at the school's dedicated sixth form.

Many A level subjects are offered at St. John Fisher Catholic High School, some of which are taught at The King's School through a collaborative arrangement.

School leadership team 
The school is led by a headteacher, deputy headteacher and four assistant headteachers, plus a business manager.  Each year House and School Councils, Head Boy/Girl, and Deputy Head Boy/Girl are elected by the students.  Many other opportunities for students to lead are provided.

GCSE and A level results 

Examination results have improved consistently at both GCSE and A level.  Progress measures are especially strong and the changes to performance tables for 2016 emphasize this.

Inspection 

Ofsted have visited the school many times in recent years following a dip in performance that saw the school placed in special measures from 2008 to 2010. Steady and continual improvement saw the school judged Good in October 2013. The corresponding Diocesan Inspection judged it to be an outstanding Catholic school.

Modernization
When the school was given over fourteen million pounds to modernize their buildings and facilities it was felt that the school itself needed to be modernized also. The school name changed to 'St. John Fisher Catholic High School', the school timetable changed from six lessons a day to four 75-minute lessons, and a new uniform and a new school logo were added. The school opened on 25 February 2009 in their old site with new facilities, buildings and a new look.

Executive head teacher Sean Hayes was appointed as permanent head teacher.

References

Secondary schools in Peterborough
Educational institutions established in 1956
Catholic secondary schools in the Diocese of East Anglia
1956 establishments in England
Voluntary aided schools in England